Calvary Christian Academy (CCA) is a private Christian school located in Cresaptown, Maryland in Allegany County. It was established as an outreach of Calvary Baptist Church of Cresaptown in 1973.

Purpose
Calvary Christian Academy is a school that has classes for grades PreK3 through 12th Grade. A full-time daycare is also operated all year. The School is accredited with the Middle States Association of Colleges and Schools and the Association of Christian Schools International. The daycare is licensed through the State of Maryland Department of Child Care.

Athletics
For fall there is boys' soccer, girls' volleyball,  middle school volleyball, and JCP soccer. In  the winter there is boys' and girls' varsity basketball and bowling. In spring there is baseball and girls' soccer.

CCA is a member of the Mason Dixon Christian Conference for baseball, basketball, soccer, and volleyball; the bowling team completes in the Allegany County Interscholastic Bowling League.

References

Baptist Christianity in Maryland
Private K-12 schools in Maryland
Schools in Allegany County, Maryland
Christian schools in Maryland
Educational institutions established in 1973
1973 establishments in Maryland
Religion in Cumberland, MD-WV-PA